Shankar Singh is the commander of the North Bihar Liberation Army and a former member of the Bihar Legislative Assembly. He was nominated as a candidate of the Lok Janshakti Party.

Personal life 
Shankar Singh is married to Pratima Kumari, who is the district chairwoman of the Hindustani Awam Morcha in Purnia.

Career

North Liberation Army 
Following the murder of  Butan Singh in 2000, the command of the North Liberation Army was taken over by Shankar Singh. The North Liberation Army was a Rajput militia formed by Butan Singh in opposition to the growing influence of Pappu Yadav in Purnia. Under Shankar Singh, the militia became politically influential by threatening and influencing voters as well as through booth capturing in the region. Upper caste candidates began seeking its support for their campaigns. The militia also groomed and supported Uday Pappu Singh who was inducted into the Bharatiya Janata Party and became the member of parliament from the Purnia constituency for two terms from 2004–2014. Shankar Singh was granted membership of the Lok Janshakti Party and stood as its candidate from the Rupauli constituency where he was elected in February 2005.

References

Living people
Criminals from Bihar
People from Purnia district
Lok Janshakti Party politicians
Year of birth missing (living people)